Dead Ringer (also known as Who Is Buried in My Grave?) is a 1964 American horror film made by Warner Bros. It was directed by Paul Henreid from a screenplay by Oscar Millard and Albert Beich from the story La Otra by Rian James, previously filmed in a Mexican version starring Dolores del Río. The music score was by André Previn and the cinematography by Ernest Haller. The film stars Bette Davis, Karl Malden and Peter Lawford with Philip Carey, Jean Hagen, George Macready, Estelle Winwood, George Chandler and Cyril Delevanti.

The film marks the second time Davis played twin sisters, the first being in the 1946 film A Stolen Life.

Plot
For almost 20 years, twin sisters Margaret and Edith have been at odds. It all started when Margaret faked her own pregnancy to "steal" Edith's fiancé, Robert DeLorca, a rich American military officer both sisters dated during World War II. Now, Robert has passed away, mourned by both sisters. Margaret will be secure for the rest of her life, courtesy the wealthy DeLorca legacy. But the forlorn Edith's prospects are dismal. Her business, a cocktail lounge, is losing money and she is threatened with eviction for not paying her bills. Edith thus plans her revenge against Margaret, phoning her to come over to her room above the bar so that they may settle their long-held score. When Margaret arrives, Edith shoots her in the head. She then swaps clothes with the corpse, framing Margaret's murder as her own suicide. She then takes over the DeLorca mansion by assuming Margaret's identity. Yet while she may look just like Margaret, the staff immediately become suspicious.

The house's Great Dane, known for hating Margaret, suddenly behaves devotedly to Edith. Not only that, but Edith is a smoker - something Margaret was adamantly against. Meanwhile, Jim, a police detective who had been seeing Edith steadily before her "suicide," visits the fake Margaret several times, asking questions. Moreover, Edith's scheme runs into trouble when she discovers that Margaret's lover, Tony (Peter Lawford), has unexpectedly shown up and very quickly sees through her charade. Thus, Tony blackmails Edith over the killing of Margaret, receiving expensive jewelry as payment. But later, Edith discovers Margaret and Tony had conspired to murder Frank by poisoning him. Tony and Edith quarrel; when he threatens her, Margaret's Great Dane attacks and kills him.

Already suspicious of DeLorca's death. Jim leads a police investigation, exhuming Frank's body and finding traces of arsenic. When Jim arrives to arrest "Margaret", Edith confesses her true identity. But Jim refuses to believe her, telling her "Edie would never hurt a fly". Edith, thus retaining her pose as Margaret, is tried, found guilty of murder, and sentenced to death. Edith submits to justice. As she is taken from the courthouse, Jim approaches her and asks if she really is Edith. She enigmatically reminds him that "Edith would never hurt a fly." She then departs for her appointment with the gas chamber.

Cast
 Bette Davis as Margaret DeLorca/Edith Phillips
 Karl Malden as Sergeant Jim Hobbson
 Peter Lawford as Tony Collins
 Philip Carey as Sergeant Hoag
 Jean Hagen as Dede Marshall
 George Macready as Paul Harrison 
 Estelle Winwood as Dona Anna
 George Chandler as George, the chauffeur
 Cyril Delevanti as Henry, the butler
 Bert Remsen as Daniel 'Dan' Lister, the bartender
 Ken Lynch as Captain Johnson
 Perry Blackwell as the jazz singer in Edie's Bar

Notes
The plot of Dead Ringer had been used in a 1946 Mexican film, La Otra, directed by Roberto Gavaldón and starring Dolores del Río. Dead Ringer was remade in 1986 as Killer in the Mirror, a television movie starring Ann Jillian. 

The film takes place in Los Angeles and Beverly Hills. The interior scenes were shot inside and outside the grounds of the Greystone Mansion in Beverly Hills. The bar scene was filmed at the corner of Temple and Figueroa in downtown Los Angeles. The burial scene was shot inside the Rosedale Cemetery in Los Angeles.

The jazz combo in Edie's Bar was composed of electronic organist Perry Lee Blackwell and drummer Kenny Dennis, both noted musicians, but uncredited in the film. Blackwell can be seen as a lounge singer at the piano in the 1959 romantic comedy “Pillow Talk”, starring Doris Day and Rock Hudson.

This was the final film of cinematographer Ernest Haller. The trick process shots in A Stolen Life were created by him, and he improved upon the process here. Makeup artist Gene Hibbs was hired due to his unique talent for making older actresses look younger through a "painting" technique.

The film was directed by the actor Paul Henreid, Davis' co-star in the 1942 romantic drama Now, Voyager. Monika Henried, one of his two daughters, plays Janet (the maid).

Henreid called making the film "a wonderful experience".

Critical reception

The film has received acclaim from modern audiences and critics. It holds a 100% approval rating on Rotten Tomatoes, based on 10 reviews.

References

External links
 
 
 
 

1964 films
Films directed by Paul Henreid
Warner Bros. films
American black-and-white films
1960s thriller films
Films about twin sisters
Films scored by André Previn
Films set in Los Angeles
American remakes of Mexican films
Psycho-biddy films
Poisoning in film
1960s English-language films